Stuart Williams is the name of:

Stuart Williams (cricketer) (born 1969), West Indian cricketer
Stuart Williams (cyclist) (born 1967), New Zealand cyclist
Stuart Williams (footballer) (1930–2013), Wales international footballer
Stuart Williams (ten-pin bowling)

See also
E. Stewart Williams (1909–2005), architect
Stewart Williams, English rugby league footballer